James W. Ames (October 12, 1864 in New Orleans, Louisiana – January 31, 1944 in Detroit, Michigan) was an American physician.

Ames was educated at Straight University (later merged into Dillard University) in New Orleans, and then received a degree from Howard University.  He had taught school in New Orleans as well.

Ames moved to Detroit in 1894.  In the mid-1890s Ames was elected as a Republican to the Michigan House of Representatives with the endorsement of Hazen Pingree.

In 1918 he led a group of 30 African-American physicians who founded Dunbar Hospital in Detroit.  This hospital was organized because no other hospital in the city would admit African-Americans at that time.  The hospital was named in honor of Paul Laurence Dunbar who had written poetry in favor of Pingree (and thus indirectly in favor of Ames) back in the 1890s.

Ames also served as a trustee of the Phillis Wheatley Home for Aged Colored Ladies.  His wife served as treasurer for this institution.

Ames also served as an inspector for the Board of Health of Detroit.

References

External links
 

1864 births
1944 deaths
Straight University alumni
Howard University alumni
Politicians from New Orleans
Physicians from Detroit
Republican Party members of the Michigan House of Representatives
African-American physicians
African-American state legislators in Michigan
20th-century African-American people
African-American men in politics